George Washington High School is located in Denver, Colorado, United States. GW is a large urban high school serving grades 9-12. George Washington is a part of the Denver Public Schools system.

Demographics 
The demographic breakdown of the 1,182 students enrolled in 2019-20 was:
Native American/Alaskan - 0.4%
Asian - 4.9%
Black - 22.5%
Hispanic - 28.5%
White - 37.9%
Multiracial - 5.58%
Native Hawaiian or Other - 0.2%
47.4% of the students were eligible for free or reduced-price lunches.

Extracurricular activities

Boys basketball
The George Washington High School boys basketball team plays in the Colorado High School Activities Association 5A class. In both 2017 and 2018, GW boys basketball was the Colorado state tournament runner-up.

Newspaper 
The school newspaper is The George Washington Surveyor, which is part of the High School National Ad Network. The paper got its name from president George Washington's lifelong association with geography and cartography. The Surveyor  was the winner of the National Pacemaker Award from the National Scholastic Press Association in 2007, 2008, and 2009.

Robotics 
George Washington's robotics functions through FIRST Robotics, with the FIRST Robotics Competition team 1410 (founded 2004 as the Patriotbots, rebranded in 2008 as The Kraken), and FIRST Tech Challenge teams 17153 (founded 2019), 18677(founded 2020), 18678(founded 2020). The Kraken has won 3 regionals and 11 awards.

Speech and debate 
The George Washington Speech And Debate team consists of over 150 students, and is ranked 5th in the nation as of May 29, 2022 by the National Speech and Debate Association.

Notable alumni 

 Chauncey Billups, former NBA player and head coach for the Portland Trail Blazers. Won a championship and Finals MVP in 2004 with the Detroit Pistons
 Sierra Boggess, theatre actress and singer
 Chris Brewer, professional football player
Doug DeMuro, YouTube car journalist
 Anita Diamant, author of The Red Tent and other fiction and non-fiction books
 Jonathan Freedman, journalist, winner of the 1987 Pulitzer Prize for Editorial Writing
 Sharon R. Long, plant biologist
 Ostell Miles, football player
 Martin Moran, Broadway actor and author of The Tricky Part
 Greg Primus, former NFL player for the Chicago Bears
 Dianne Reeves, jazz vocalist, winner of Grammy Award for Best Jazz Vocal Album in 2001, 2002, 2004, and 2006
 Ed Smith, former NFL player for the Denver Broncos

References

External links 
 

Public high schools in Colorado
High schools in Denver
International Baccalaureate schools in Colorado